German submarine U-806 was a Type IXC/40 U-boat built for Nazi Germany's Kriegsmarine during World War II.

U-801 was ordered on 10 April 1941 from DeSchiMAG Seebeckwerft in Geestemünde under the yard number 364. Her keel was laid down on 27 April 1943 and the U-boat was launched sometime late in 1943. On 29 April 1944 she was commissioned into service under the command of Kapitänleutnant Klaus Hornbostel (Crew 34) in the 4th U-boat Flotilla.

Design
German Type IXC/40 submarines were slightly larger than the original Type IXCs. U-806 had a displacement of  when at the surface and  while submerged. She had two shafts and two  propellers.

U-806 was fitted with six  torpedo tubes (four fitted at the bow and two at the stern), 22 torpedoes, one  SK C/32 naval gun, 180 rounds, and a  Flak M42 as well as two twin  C/30 anti-aircraft guns. The boat had a complement of forty-eight.

Service history
After work up for deployment in the Baltic Sea, U-806 transferred to the 33rd U-boat Flotilla for front-line service on 1 November 1944. She left Kiel for her first - and only - war patrol on 30 October. On the way to her assigned operational area off Canada she stopped at Horten Naval Base and Kristiansand. An attack on another Canadian escort, HMCS Transcona, failed.

Two months later, U-806 returned to base via Norway, arriving in Flensburg on 27 February 1945. Spending the rest of the war in training, U-806 ran aground on Hatter Reef on 5 May 1945 and had to be towed free by a tug the next day. She arrived in Aarhus later that day in order to surrender to the Allies.

On 22 June 1945 the U-boat was transferred to Loch Ryan via Fredericia, Kiel, and Wilhelmshaven, arriving in Scotland on 26 June.

Summary of raiding history

References

Notes

Citations

Bibliography

External links

World War II submarines of Germany
German Type IX submarines
1943 ships
U-boats commissioned in 1944
Ships sunk as targets
U-boats sunk by Polish warships
Ships built in Bremen (state)
U-boats sunk in 1945
Maritime incidents in December 1945
Operation Deadlight